Linda Lorraine Bean (born April 28, 1941) is an American businessperson and donor. As a candidate of the Republican Party, Bean ran unsuccessfully for the United States Congress in 1988 and 1992. She is the granddaughter of Leon Leonwood Bean and an heiress to the L.L.Bean company.

Business interests
In 2007, Bean started her own lobster business by starting with buying a wharf in Port Clyde. She later purchased others in Tenants Harbor and on the island of Vinalhaven. Her business eventually produced over nine million pounds of lobster annually. In 2016, Bean partially retired and turned over majority ownership of her lobster enterprises to her general manager and employees in an employee stock ownership plan (ESOP). With John Hathaway, in whose Shucks Maine Lobster she also invested, Bean took the lead in achieving sustainability certification for the entire Maine coast trap lobster fishery by meeting the standards of the Marine Stewardship Council as announced by its founder Rupert Howes and by Maine Governor Paul LePage on March 10, 2013, at the International Boston Seafood Show.

Bean's investment in the lobster industry has not been without controversy. She has argued for more lobster processing in Maine rather than in Canada, where more than half of Maine's lobsters currently go for processing and sale by other companies to the U.S. and elsewhere. Additionally, an undercover video taken by PETA allegedly at one of the Maine Lobster processing plants showed workers ripping limbs off live lobsters, raising questions of animal cruelty. A lawyer for Bean told the Portland Press Herald that "Our practices do not violate Maine's laws on cruelty to animals because lobsters do not come within the covered definition."

In addition to the lobster industry, Bean's interests include the timber and hospitality industries. She owns large tracts of timber in western Maine, including maple syrup producing sugarbushes in Weld and Wyman, Maine. Under the brand name enterprise "Linda Bean's Perfect Maine," she rents out vacation cottages and wedding locations and operates various businesses in midcoast Maine including two general stores in St. George. In 2015, she initiated Linda Bean's Maine Wyeth Gallery in Port Clyde, and personally scripted Wyeths by Water art excursions on her converted lobster boat "Linderin Losh." She owns the Seaside Inn and Barn Cafe in Port Clyde, the Dip Net wharf restaurant and nearby historic Ocean House and Dining Room. Her restaurants feature her grandfather's camp recipes and her own Perfect Maine lobster roll that has sold over 2 million since she introduced it in Freeport, Maine, in 2008 based on her own recipe. The Portland International Airport features a Linda Bean's Maine Lobster Cafe with a full lounge bar. Her restaurant and Internet brand offer products such as lobster bisque, lobster ravioli, coffee, sea salt, and barbecue sauce. Her largest Maine restaurant is Linda Bean's Maine Kitchen & Topside Tavern located across from the L.L.Bean flagship store in Freeport, Maine, the original site of a tavern built there in 1790. On September 27, 2010, Bean purchased the original tavern location from a retired fellow Freeport native George Denney, who started his career in her grandfather's store and went on to  purchase a little known Freeport shoe company brand, Cole Haan, that he sold to Nike.

In April 2018, Bean opened an antiques stores in Freeport adjoining her grandfather's former home, bringing together three dozen antiques and art dealers under the name Freeport Antiques & Heirlooms Showcase. In 2019, the business expanded to include Casco Bay Auctions.

Philanthropy
Bean serves on the boards of numerous philanthropic organizations. These include the Brandywine Conservancy and Museum of Art in Chadds Ford, Pennsylvania, the Maine Historical Society, the Maine Chapter of The Nature Conservancy, and the Portland Museum of Art. She currently serves as vice-chairman of the Board of Trustees of Intercollegiate Studies Institute, Wilmington, Delaware.

In 2016 she was awarded the honorary degree of  Doctor of Humane Letters by The Kings College in Manhattan.

In 2019 she founded The N.C.Wyeth Research Foundation and Reading Libraries, a non-profit private operating foundation established in Massachusetts to focus on the illustrator's home in Needham and other locations important to his leading contribution to the American age of book, magazine, calendar and poster illustration.

In January 2020, Linda Bean was one of thirteen "Women of Vision" honorees announced by the Farnsworth Art Museum. This was met with controversy in the midcoast Maine community due her political activities (see below).

Political activities

Publisher of The Maine Paper 
Bean served as publisher of The Maine Paper, a conservative newspaper published from 1979 to 1982.

Congressional campaigns
Bean ran twice for Congress in 1988 and 1992. In 1988, Bean sought the Republican nomination for the United States House of Representatives to challenge incumbent former Maine Governor Joseph Brennan. She ran under her married named of Linda Bean Jones. She outspent her opponent, Edward S. O'Meara, by $395,000 but narrowly lost.

Bean ran again in 1992 for the Republican nomination, this time to challenge incumbent Democrat Thomas Andrews. She won the nomination but lost 65% to 35% in the general election.

Stances on women's and LGBTQI rights
Linda Bean served as the vice chairman of the conservative group Eagle Forum Education and Legal Defense Fund for many years. In 2005, Bean gave $10,000 to the Maine Grassroots Coalition,  whose goal was to repeal a Maine law making discrimination based on sexual orientation illegal in employment, housing, credit, public accommodations, and education. Bean was also the funder of the ERA Impact Coalition in Maine, who succeeded in their goal of overturning the passage of the statewide Equal Rights Amendment in Maine in 1984. In 2017, Bean, as part of The Conservative Action project, signed a Memo for the Movement called "Restoring America's Military Strength: Military Readiness or Transgender Politics" calling on the U.S. Defense Department to "rescind Defense Department and military service directives permitting transgender individuals to serve" and for the Trump Administration to "discontinue funding and directing personnel resources for special-interest events, including LGBT-Pride Month events in June."

Longtime Conservative Activism
In 1985, Linda Bean (then known as Linda Jones) accompanied Phylis Schlafly and other members of the Eagle Forum to the Geneva Convention, with the goal of advancing their conservative politics, and particularly in pressuring President Reagan on issues related to a Strategic Defense Initiative.

In 2016, the Southern Poverty Law Center revealed that Linda Bean is a member of the then-35-year-old "shadowy and intensely secretive group" The Council for National Policy; they say that what is "most remarkable about the directory is that it reveals how the CNP has become a key meeting place where ostensibly mainstream conservatives interact with individuals who are, by any reasonable definition, genuinely extremist. She is a longtime member, joining the Council for National Policy "after the Reagan years.

Donations
In 2016, Bean donated $25,000 to Making Maine Great Again PAC, a group supporting then-candidate Donald Trump's presidential campaign. Her donation led to calls for her to be removed from the board of L.L. Bean, though Bean herself clarified the donation was her own and not the company's.

In April 2020, Bean gave $12,500 to the Club for Growth Action PAC, which is known for donating to conservative politicians and organizations.

Electoral history

Source:

References

External links
 Linda Bean's Perfect Maine Official Website

1941 births
Living people
Businesspeople from Maine
Maine Republicans
Women in Maine politics
People from Cumberland County, Maine
People from Knox County, Maine
Antioch College alumni
Alaska Pacific University alumni
20th-century American newspaper publishers (people)
20th-century American businesspeople
20th-century American businesswomen
21st-century American businesswomen
21st-century American businesspeople
American women business executives